is a 2003 Japanese drama film directed by Junji Sakamoto, starring Arisa Mizuki. It is based on the comic of the same name by Rieko Saibara.

The film won the special jury prize at the Las Palmas de Gran Canaria International Film Festival in 2003.

Cast
 Arisa Mizuki
 Ran Otori
 Yuma Yamoto
 Yuki Tanaka
 Claude Maki
 Ittoku Kishibe
 Eiko Shinya
 Eiji Minakata
 Matsunosuke Shofukutei
 Masaru Shiga
 Koji Imada
 Masaru Hamaguchi

References

External links
 
 

2003 films
Films directed by Junji Sakamoto
Japanese drama films
2000s Japanese films